Louis Wolfson II (September 19, 1927 – October 11, 1979) was a member of the Florida House of Representatives from Miami-Dade County from 1963–1973.

Biography
Wolfson was the son of Frances Meyer (1906–1980) and Mitchell Wolfson (1900–1983), who founded Wometco Enterprises in 1925 and was the first Jewish mayor of Miami Beach in 1943. Louis Wolfson II's younger brother is Mitchell Wolfson Jr., the founder of the Wolfsonian Museum.

The Lynn and Louis Wolfson II Florida Moving Image Archives (The Wolfson Archives) are named in honor of Louis Wolfson II and his wife Lynn Wolfson, one of the co-founders, who considered the archives "her signature work."

Louis Wolfson II and his wife Lynn Wolfson (née Rabin) had three children, Lynda Louise, Frances Jo and Louis Wolfson III.
Louis Wolfson II died in 1979  in Miami, Florida.

References

1927 births
1979 deaths
Jewish American philanthropists
Jewish American state legislators in Florida
Politicians from Miami
Democratic Party members of the Florida House of Representatives
Wometco Enterprises
20th-century American politicians
20th-century American philanthropists
Wolfson family
20th-century American Jews